Steven Wilcox is a Canadian professional boxer.

Background
Wilcox started boxing at the age of 11 and, by 21, was a full-time professional boxer. 

Wilcox won the Canadian lightweight championship in 2013, scoring an eighth-round TKO, as Wilcox defeated journeyman Marcel Maillet Jr. to win his first pro belt. He turned pro in 2012 after defeating Nicolas Valcourt in February 2011 (and an amateur career with over 180 fights).

WBA-NABA Super Lightweight Champion 
On October 1, 2016 Steven Wilcox defeated Jesus Kibunde Kakonge in a 10 round unanimous decision bout in Hamilton, Ontario, Canada at the Hamilton Convention Centre for the "Fights4TheCure" charity, presented by Dan Otter. Wilcox became the WBA-NABA Super Lightweight champion.

C.P.B.C Light Welterweight Rankings 
Steven Wilcox is currently ranked 4th in the Light Welterweight division/Canadian Professional Boxing Council

Professional boxing record 

| style="text-align:center;" colspan="8"|15 wins (5 knockouts), 1 losses, 1 draws, 0 no contests
|-  style="text-align:center; background:#e3e3e3;"
|  style="border-style:none none solid solid; "|Res.
|  style="border-style:none none solid solid; "|Record
|  style="border-style:none none solid solid; "|Opponent
|  style="border-style:none none solid solid; "|Type
|  style="border-style:none none solid solid; "|Round
|  style="border-style:none none solid solid; "|Date
|  style="border-style:none none solid solid; "|Location
|  style="border-style:none none solid solid; "|Notes
|- style="text-align:center;"
|- align=center
|Win
|15-1-1
|align=left|
|
|
|
|align=left|
|align=left|
|- style="text-align:center;"
|Win
|14-1-1
|align=left|
|
|
|
|align=left|
|align=left|
|- style="text-align:center;"
|Win
|13-1-1
|align=left|
|
|
|
|align=left|
|align=left|
|- style="text-align:center;"
|Win
|12-1-1
|align=left|
|
|
|
|align=left|
|align=left|
|- style="text-align:center;"
|style="background:#abcdef;"|Draw
|11-1-1
|align=left|
|
|
|
|align=left|
|align=left|
|- style="text-align:center;"
|Win
|11-1-0
|align=left|
|
|
|
|align=left|
|align=left|
|- style="text-align:center;"
|Win
|10-1-0
|align=left|
|
|
|
|align=left|
|align=left|
|- style="text-align:center;"
|Win
|9-1-0
|align=left|
|
|
|
|align=left|
|align=left|
|- style="text-align:center;"
|Loss
|8-1-0
|align=left|
|
|
|
|align=left|
|align=left|
|- style="text-align:center;"
|Win
|8-0-0
|align=left|
|
|
|
|align=left|
|align=left|
|- style="text-align:center;"
|Win
|7-0-0
|align=left|
|
|
|
|align=left|
|align=left|
|- style="text-align:center;"
|Win
|6-0-0
|align=left|
|
|
|
|align=left|
|align=left|
|- style="text-align:center;"
|Win
|5-0-0
|align=left|
|
|
|
|align=left|
|align=left|
|- style="text-align:center;"
|Win
|4-0-0
|align=left|
|
|
|
|align=left|
|align=left|
|- style="text-align:center;"
|Win
|3-0-0
|align=left|
|
|
|
|align=left|
|align=left|
|- style="text-align:center;"
|Win
|2-0-0
|align=left|
|
|
|
|align=left|
|align=left|
|- style="text-align:center;"
|Win
|1-0-0
|align=left|
|
|
|
|align=left|
|align=left|
|- style="text-align:center;"

References 

Canadian male boxers
Living people
Sportspeople from Hamilton, Ontario
Light-welterweight boxers
Year of birth missing (living people)